Archie Thomas Manners (born 19 May 1993) is a British comedian, magician, and television host. He hosted The Royal World, a reality television series on MTV International which aired in 2018. He and Josh Pieters host an eponymous channel on YouTube with more than 1 million subscribers.

Biography 
Manners was born on 19 May 1993 to Robert Hugh Manners and Samantha S. Jukes. A great-grandson of Francis Henry Manners, 4th Baron Manners, he is fifteenth in the line of succession to the Manners Barony and, as a descendant of John Manners, 3rd Duke of Rutland, twenty-fifth in the line of succession to the Dukedom of Rutland. He grew up in Hampshire. He earned a degree in political studies from University of Bristol.

Manners hosts the reality television series The Royal World on MTV International and starred in Comedy Central's Trickheads. He also hosts British television show Look into My Eyes on E4. Manners has an online series for The Hook called Archie Asks. He also writes a satirical column for the Gentleman's Journal.

YouTube 

In September 2019, Manners partnered with YouTuber Josh Pieters to create a fake restaurant, called The Italian Stallion, through Deliveroo that delivered microwavable meals as an experiment. They returned all of the profits that they had made. In November 2019, they followed this up with a prank at the KSI vs. Logan Paul II boxing match, where they managed to convince several attendees that an Ed Sheeran lookalike was the actual Ed Sheeran.

In January 2020, English far-right political commentator Katie Hopkins was pranked by Manners and Pieters into accepting a fake award, titled the "Campaign to Unify the Nation Trophy". Pieters flew Hopkins to Prague where she accepted the award and gave a speech, while the initials of the fictitious award were prominently displayed in the background, forming the swear word "cunt". The pair uploaded the prank to their YouTube channel on the same day that Hopkins was suspended from Twitter for breaking their anti-hate rules.

In May 2020, Manners and Pieters pranked Big Cat Rescue CEO, Carole Baskin, into believing she was giving an interview on The Tonight Show Starring Jimmy Fallon.

References

External links 

 https://www.youtube.com/c/joshpieters/videos

1993 births
21st-century English comedians
Alumni of the University of Bristol
English columnists
English magicians
English male comedians
English television presenters
Living people
Archie
Mass media people from Hampshire
Prank YouTubers
YouTube channels launched in 2015